Georgina may refer to:

Names 

Georgina (name), a feminine given name

Places

Australia 

 Georgina, Queensland, a locality in the Shire of Boulia, Queensland
 Georgina Basin, a large sedimentary basin in Australia
 Georgina River, a river which drains the Georgina Basin

Canada 

Georgina, Ontario, a town in south-central Ontario, Canada
Georgina Ice, a Junior Hockey team in Georgina, Ontario
Georgina Public Libraries, the public library system of Georgina, Ontario
Georgina Island, an island and First Nations reserve in Lake Simcoe offshore of Georgina, Ontario

Other 

Georgina (grasshopper), a genus of grasshoppers in the family Episactidae
Georgina, a synonym for the plant genus Dahlia

See also
Georgia (disambiguation)